Voyager is the thirteenth studio album by American rock band 311. It was released on July 12, 2019. It is the second to be produced by John Feldmann and the fifth to be produced by Scotch Ralston. Matan Zohar is also listed as a producer.

Composition
Voyager has been labeled as alternative rock and rap rock by Rock Cellar Magazine, and reggae rock by AllMusic.

Track listing

Personnel
Credits adapted from liner notes.

311
 Nick Hexum – vocals, rhythm guitar, keyboards
 SA Martinez – vocals
 Chad Sexton – drums
 Tim Mahoney – lead guitar
 P-Nut – bass

Additional musicians
 Luke Miller - keyboards (tracks 4 and 7)

Production
 Produced and recorded by Scotch Ralston (tracks 1-5, 7, 8, 10, and 12)
 Assisted by Jason Walters
 Produced and recorded by John Feldmann (tracks 6, 9, 11, and 13)
 Additional production and engineer: Matt Malpass
 Mixed by Neal Avron
 Mastered by Joe Gastwirt
 Management: Peter Katsis, Peter Raspler, Joel Mark at YMU Group
 Album artwork: Sam Williams at Magictorch
 Art direction: Randall Leddy
 Band photos: Brian Bowen Smith
 A&R: Joel Mark
 Marketing: Jason Hradil

Charts

References

2019 albums
311 (band) albums
Albums produced by John Feldmann